The first season of Zumbo's Just Desserts premiered in Australia on August 22, 2016, on Seven Network. Twelve contestants were selected to compete. The winner of the first season won the grand prize of $100,000, gets an opportunity have one of their creations in Zumbo's stores  and finally the title of "Zumbo's Just Desserts Winner".

The show is hosted by Adriano Zumbo and Rachel Khoo, with Gigi Falanga as assistant.

The winner was 37 year old Kate Ferguson.

Competition structure
Each chapter is divided into two stages. The "Sweet Sensations task" and the "Zumbo Test".

During the first challenge, regularly with a duration of three hours, each contestant must create a dessert following the theme and rules given by the judges at the beginning. Rachel and Zumbo evaluate each of the creations, determining a winner, who gets the Dessert Of The Day. They also declare those who were safe from the second phase and the two bakers who will go to the second phase or elimination round.

The elimination round, or Zumbo Test, consists of testing the bottom bakers with original Zumbo creations, where at least one baker will go home.

Contestants

Contestant progress

 'Dessert Of The Day'
 Produce the favorite dessert but was not crowned 'Dessert Of The Day'
 Produce the worst dessert but was not in the 'Zumbo Test'
 Won the 'Zumbo Test'
 Lost the 'Zumbo Test'
 Eliminated
 Won 'Golden Ticket' to the Grand Final
 Sent to the Semi-Final
 Series winner
 Series runner up
DOTD: Dessert Of The Day 
ZT: Zumbo Test 
DNP: Through to the Finals

Series details

Episode 1 - Reflective Dessert
 Airdate — 22 August 2016
 Sweet Sensations — The Dessert Makers had to create a dessert that reflected themselves.
 Zumbo Test — The bottom two contestants had to recreate Zumbo's dessert dome. The lower scoring contestant is then eliminated.

Episode 2 - Franken-Dessert
 Airdate — 23 August 2016
 Sweet Sensations — The Dessert Makers had to create a franken-dessert, a combination of two desserts in one.
 Zumbo Test — The bottom two had to recreate the FrankenZumbo, made from five different desserts. The lower scoring contestant would be eliminated.

Episode 3 - Love & Chocolate Dessert
 Airdate — 24 August 2016
 Sweet Sensations — The Dessert Makers had to make a romantic dessert with chocolate as the main ingredient.
 Zumbo Test — The bottom two had to recreate Zumbo's love themed Croquembouche, the Lovenbouche. The lower scoring contestant would be eliminated.

Episode 4 - Kids' Party Cake
 Airdate — 29 August 2016
 Sweet Sensations — Each Dessert Maker had to create a cake suited for a kids' party, with little Zumbinos (kids) to taste the cakes
 Zumbo Test — The bottom two had to recreate Zumbo's school desk inspired cake named "back-to-school". The lower scoring contestant was eliminated

Episode 5 - Defies Gravity
 Airdate — 30 August 2016
 Sweet Sensations — The Dessert Makers had to create a dessert that defies gravity
 Zumbo Test — The bottom two had to recreate Zumbo's Willy Wonka inspired dessert named "Hat Trick". The lower scoring contestant was eliminated.

Episode 6 - Arnott's Biscuits
 Airdate — 5 September 2016
 Sweet Sensations — The dessert makers had to make Australia's favourite biscuit, Arnott's biscuit, into a delicious dessert. 
 Zumbo Test — The bottom two had to recreate six out of 12 Zumbo created biscuits named "Epic Biscuit Time". The contestant who scored lowest was eliminated.

Episode 7 - Flaming Dessert
 Airdate — 6 September 2016
 Sweet Sensations — The dessert makers had to create a dessert inspired by fire
 Zumbo Test — The bottom two had to recreate Zumbo's "Ice" Dessert. The lower scoring contestant was eliminated.

Episode 8 - Classic Aussie Dessert
 Airdate — 12 September 2016
 Sweet Sensations — The dessert makers had to create a reimagining of a classic Aussie dessert
 Zumbo Test — The bottom two had to recreate Zumbo's Frosty Fruit iceblock inspired dessert named "Frosty Fruit Tart". The lower scoring contestant was eliminated.

Episode 9 - Fruit Dessert
 Airdate — 13 September 2016
 Sweet Sensations — The dessert makers had to create a dessert inspired by fruit
 Zumbo Test — The bottom two had to recreate Zumbo's flower inspired dessert named "Nancy's Garden", named after Zumbo's mum. The lower scoring contestant was eliminated.

Episode 10 - High Tea
 Airdate — 19 September 2016
 Sweet Sensations — The dessert makers had to create the most luxurious high tea, three portions of three different lavish and extravagant desserts. The top two contestants were sent to the Zumbo Test with the bottom contestant sent to the Semi-final
 Zumbo Test — The top two had to recreate Zumbo's dessert in form of a bathtub called Golden Duckie. The higher scoring contestant was given a golden ticket, sending them straight to the Grand Final. The lower scoring contestants were sent to the Semi-final

Episode 11 - Semi-final
 Airdate — 20 September 2016
 Sweet Sensations — The dessert makers had to create a dessert that measured at least 30 cm high without any inedible structure included.
 Zumbo Test — The dessert makers had to recreate Zumbo's eight vanilla layered cake the size of a matchbox named "V8 Vanilla Cake". The higher scoring contestant was sent to the Grand Final, the lower scoring contestant was eliminated.

Episode 12 - Grand Finale
 Airdate — 27 September 2016
 Detail — Unlike former episodes, the final two took part in the Zumbo Test first and the Sweet Sensations last.
 Final Zumbo Test — The final two contestants had to recreate Zumbo's dessert named "Sugar & Spice"
 Final Sweet Sensations — The final two had to create a dessert inspired by their favourite fairytale. The higher scoring contestant would be announced Winner of Zumbo's Just Desserts.

References 

2016 Australian television seasons